Charley may refer to:

Places
Charley, Leicestershire, a parish in England
Charley's Flat, alternate name for Dutch Flat, California
Charley's Motel, former name of Star Lite Motel, Minnesota, United States
Charley Ridge, West Virginia, United States
Charley's Trace, trail to the Mississippi River
Charley's Automotive Service, National Register of Historic Places listing in New Mexico, United States

Rivers, streams & creeks
Charley River, river in Alaska
Yukon–Charley Rivers National Preserve, national preserve containing the Charley River basin
Charley Creek (Clallam River), Washington State, United States
Charley Creek (Asotin Creek), Washington State, United States
Dutch Charley Creek, Minnesota, United States
Lake Charley, Lake in Minnesota, United States

People
Charley (name)

Other
Cascade Charley, fountain and sculpture in Oregon, United States by Alice Wingwall,
Charley ATL, Azerbaijani band
Charley horse, leg muscles spasms
Goodtime Charley, musical that earned 7 Tony Award nominations
Hurricane Charley (disambiguation), the name of several tropical cyclones, namely the storm which impacted Florida in 2004

See also 
 Charles
 Charlie (disambiguation)
 Charly (disambiguation)
 Chuck (disambiguation)
 Charlotte